

cp
CPM

cr

cre-cri
creatinolfosfate (INN)
crenezumab (USAN, INN)
crenolanib (USAN, INN)
Creo-Terpin
Creomulsion Cough
Creon 10
Creon 20
Creon 25
Creon 5
Crescormon
Cresemba
cresotamide (INN)
Crestor
Cresylate
crilvastatin (INN)
Crinone
crisaborole
crisnatol (INN)
Criticare HN
Crixivan
Crizanlizumab-tmca 
crizotinib (USAN), INN)

cro-cry
croconazole (INN)
CroFab
Crofelemer
crolibulin (USAN, INN)
Crolom
Cromolyn 
cromakalim (INN)
cromitrile (INN)
cromoglicate lisetil (INN)
cromoglicic acid (INN)
Cromoptic
cronidipine (INN)
cropropamide (INN)
croscarmellose (INN)
crospovidone (INN)
Crosseal
cross-linked hyaluronate viscoelastic hydrogel
crotalidae polyvalent immune fab ovine
crotamiton (INN)
Crotan
crotetamide (INN)
crotoniazide (INN)
Cruex
crufomate (INN)
cryofluorane (INN)
Cryselle
Crystamine
Crysti 1000
Crysticillin A.S.
Crystodigin
Crysvita

cs-ct
CSP
CTX

cu
Cu-7
Cubicin
cupric chloride
Cuprimine
cuprimyxin (INN)
cuproxoline (INN)
Curosurf
Curretab
custirsen (USAN, INN)
Cutar
Cutivate
Cuvitru
Cuvposa

cy

cya
cyacetacide (INN)
cyamemazine (INN)
cyanocobalamin (57 Co) (INN)
cyanocobalamin (58 Co) (INN)
cyanocobalamin (60 Co) (INN)
cyanocobalamin (INN)
Cyanoject
Cyanokit (Pfizer)

cyc

cycl

cycla-cycli
Cyclafem
Cyclaine
cyclandelate (INN)
Cyclapen-W
cyclarbamate (INN)
cyclazocine (INN)
cyclazodone (INN)
Cyclessa
cyclexanone (INN)
cycliramine (INN)
cyclizine (INN)

cyclo
cyclobarbital (INN)
cyclobenzaprine (INN)
cyclobutoic acid (INN)
cyclobutyrol (INN)
Cyclocort
cyclofenil (INN)
cycloguanil embonate (INN)
Cyclogyl
Cyclomen. Redirects to Danazol.
cyclomenol (INN)
cyclomethycaine (INN)
Cyclomydril
Cyclopar
cyclopentamine (INN)
cyclopenthiazide (INN)
cyclopentolate (INN)
cyclophosphamide (INN)
cyclopregnol (INN)
cyclopropane (INN)
cyclopyrronium bromide (INN)
cycloserine (INN)
Cycloset
Cyclospasmol
cyclosporine
cyclothiazide (INN)
cyclovalone (INN)

cyco-cyfo
Cycofed Pediatric
cycotiamine (INN)
cycrimine (INN)
Cycrin
Cyfolex

cyh-cys
cyheptamide (INN)
cyheptropine (INN)
Cyklokapron
Cylate
Cylert
Cylex
Cyltezo
Cymbalta
cynarine (INN)
Cyomin
cypenamine (INN)
cyprazepam (INN)
cyprenorphine (INN)
cyprodenate (INN)
cyproheptadine (INN)
cyprolidol (INN)
cyproterone (INN)
Cyramza
cyromazine (INN)
Cystadane
Cystadrops
Cystagon
Cystaran
cysteamine bitartrate 
cysteine (INN)
Cystastat
Cysto-Conray II
Cystografin
Cystospaz
Cysview

cyt
CYT
Cytadren
cytarabine (INN)
Cytalux
Cytarabine
CytoGam
cytomegalovirus immune globulin intravenous human
Cytomel
Cytosar-U (Pharmacia & Upjohn Company) 
Cytotec
Cytovene
Cytoxan (Bristol-Myers Squibb)
Cytra-3
Cytra-K